BTRC may refer to:

Bangladesh Telecommunication Regulatory Commission,  an independent commission of Bangladesh Government
Beta-transducin repeat containing, a human gene
Blacksburg Tactical Research Center, an American game publishing company
National State Television and Radio Company of Belarus
2-deoxy-scyllo-inosose synthase, an enzyme